The Villanova Wildcats women's basketball team represents Villanova University in Villanova, Pennsylvania, United States.

History
The school's team currently competes in the Big East, where it has competed since the 1982–83 season.  The women's basketball team began competing in 1969–70 under coach Liz Cawley, obtaining a 4–6 record in its inaugural season, and an 8–5 record and its first winning season the following year. Coach Harry Perretta coached the team for 42 seasons retiring after the 2019–2020 season. Perretta took the helm of the program in 1978. In the fall of 2019 it was announced that Perretta's 2019–2020 season would be his last season coaching the Wildcats after a 42-year tenure with the program. He was honored at the team's last home game of the 2019–2020 season at the Finneran Pavilion. The Wildcats are currently coached by Denise Dillon. On January 20, 2023, Maddy Siegrist became the program's all-time leading scorer, breaking Shelly Pennefather's record.

Yearly record

Postseason results

NCAA Division I

AIAW Division I
The Wildcats made one appearance in the AIAW National Division I basketball tournament, with a combined record of 2–1.

References

External links